Simon Magus is a 1999 British historical mystery drama film directed by Ben Hopkins and starring Noah Taylor and Stuart Townsend. It was entered into the 49th Berlin International Film Festival.

Background
The film is named for the village fool Simon (Noah Taylor), who is in turn named for the 1st century magician Simon Magus.

Plot
In 19th century Poland, a Jew named Dovid Bendel (Stuart Townsend) tries to revive his dwindling shtetl village by building a railway station next to it. The squire (Rutger Hauer) agrees to provide the land, on the condition that Dovid will read his poetry. A cunning business man (Sean McGinley) is also interested in the land and he tries to compete using money and threats. Through this all wanders the outcast Simon (Noah Taylor), a man rumoured to have magical powers.

Cast
 Stuart Townsend as Dovid Bendel
 Noah Taylor as Simon Magus
 Rutger Hauer as Count Albrecht
 Embeth Davidtz as Leah
 Sean McGinley as Hase
 Ian Holm as Sirius/Boris/Head
 Terence Rigby as Bratislav
 Amanda Ryan as Sarah
 David de Keyser as Rabbi
 Toby Jones as Buchholtz
 Kathryn Hunter as Grandmother
 Walter Sparrow as Benjamin
 Jean Anderson as Roise

References

External links

1999 films
1999 romantic drama films
British mystery films
British romance films
British fantasy films
Films directed by Ben Hopkins
Films about Jews and Judaism
British romantic drama films
The Devil in film
1990s English-language films
1990s British films